New York's 136th State Assembly district is one of the 150 districts in the New York State Assembly. It has been represented by Sarah Clark since 2021, succeeding Jamie Romeo.

Geography 
District 136 is located entirely within Monroe County. It contains outer Rochester and the nearby suburbs of Irondequoit and Brighton.

Recent election results

2022

2020

2018

2016

2014

2012

References

136
Monroe County, New York